A referendum on creating the post of President of Russia was held in the Russian Soviet Federative Socialist Republic on 17 March 1991. The referendum was held alongside a referendum of the preservation of USSR. Prior to the referendum, the Russian head of state was the Chairman of the Supreme Soviet of the Russian SFSR, elected by the Congress of People's Deputies of the Russian SFSR. With 71.4% of voters approving the proposal, the post of President of the Russian SFSR was introduced, and two months later Boris Yeltsin was elected as the first president.

Question

Results

Gallery

References

Referendums in Russia
Referendums in the Soviet Union
Russian presidential referendum
presidential referendum
Decommunization
Perestroika
presidential referendum